Charles Guthrie may refer to:
Charles Guthrie, American athletic director for Akron Zips
 Charles Guthrie, Baron Guthrie of Craigiebank (born 1938), British Field Marshal, former Chief of the Defence Staff
 Charles Claude Guthrie (1880–1963), American physiologist
Charles John Guthrie, Lord Guthrie (1849–1920), Scottish judge